The Daily 10 (also known as The D10) is an American daily television entertainment news show that aired on cable channel E! from March 2006 to October 2010. Hosts count down the top ten entertainment news stories of the day.

Segments
In addition to entertainment news, The Daily 10 featured segments that cover fashion, music and movie reviews. Regular segments include: "The Lyon's Den" in which resident movie critic, Ben Lyons reviews upcoming films. "Flashy or Trashy", celebrity fashion critiques by Robbie Laughlin, and "Fashion Trends" with Amanda Luttrell Garrigus.

Every Friday, the show featured rapper Infinite-1 performing the Hollywood Rap-Up.

Other regular segments included "Fashion Round-Up", "Quick Hitters", "Who wore it better?" "True or False", "Now Hear This", and "Spotted."

On weekends, The Daily 10 was compiled of news and segments from the previous week.

On-air staff

Anchors

Sal Masekela - anchor (2006–2010)
Catt Sadler - anchor (2006–2010)
Debbie Matenopoulos - anchor (2006–2009)

Correspondents

Ben Lyons - film critic/correspondent (2006–2010)
Clinton Sparks - music correspondent (2007–2010)
Jason Kennedy - fill-in anchor (2006–2010)
Ashlan Gorse - fill-in anchor (2008–2010)
Kristina Guerrero - fill-in anchor (2008–2010)
Amy Paffrath - correspondent/fill-in anchor (2010)
Robbie Laughlin - fashion correspondent (2006–2010)
Amanda Luttrell Garrigus - fashion correspondent (2006–2010)
Michael Yo - celebrity correspondent (2007–2010)
Damien Fahey - fill-in anchor (2010)
Michael Catherwood - fill-in anchor (2010)
Morgan Webb - fill-in anchor (2010)

Cancellation
On September 27, 2010, E! had announced that it had cancelled The Daily Ten after four years on the air. The final edition of the program aired on October 1, 2010. E! had previously announced on September 21, 2010 that its flagship entertainment news program E! News would expand back to its previous hour-long format on October 25, 2010 (reruns of E! reality programs such as Keeping Up with the Kardashians aired in the three weeks prior to the expansion of E! News), and E! News incorporated some of The Daily 10's featured segments and some personalities featured on the program.

References

External links
 

2006 American television series debuts
2010 American television series endings
2000s American television news shows
2010s American television news shows
Television shows filmed in Los Angeles
E! original programming
English-language television shows
Entertainment news shows in the United States